Game of Homes is a Canadian reality television series, which premiered on W Network on March 17, 2015. Hosted by Cameron Mathison in season 1 and Dave Salmoni in season 2, the series features four couples per season who are competing to renovate four rundown houses. Season 1 is based in Vancouver, while the show moves to Toronto for season 2.

In conjunction with the series, Corus Entertainment also produced a shorter web series, Cameron's House Rules, which profiles Mathison doing renovation projects on his own home.

Broadcast
In Australia, the series premiered on 6 August 2015 on LifeStyle Home. The show aired in the United States on Discovery Family from September 6, 2016 to October 23, 2017.

References

2015 Canadian television series debuts
2010s Canadian reality television series
Discovery Family original programming
Home renovation television series
Television series by Corus Entertainment
W Network original programming